Martin Koch (4 September 1887 – 1 August 1961) was a German cyclist. He competed in two events at the 1912 Summer Olympics.

References

External links
 

1887 births
1961 deaths
German male cyclists
Olympic cyclists of Germany
Cyclists at the 1912 Summer Olympics
Cyclists from Bavaria
Sportspeople from Ingolstadt